Gilbert Mapemba (born 26 July 1985) is a Zimbabwean defender, generally playing at right back.

Career
Mapemba started his career at Circle Cement FC (Zimbabwe), playing there from 2003 to 2004. He then played for Buymore FC between 2005 and 2007. He then joined CAPS United F.C. from 2008 to 2011. He then went on to join the Moroka Swallows of South Africa, where he signed a three year deal. He was part of the Moroka Swallows team which finished second in the local Premiership for the 2011-12 season, and which won The MTN8 in 2012.

Mapemba's contract with Moroka Swallows was not renewed because of the "5 foreign player policy" in the South African Premier Soccer League, as the team wanted to add foreign strikers. He currently is a free agent.

References

External links

Living people
1985 births
Zimbabwean footballers
Zimbabwe international footballers
Association football defenders
CAPS United players
Expatriate soccer players in South Africa
Moroka Swallows F.C. players
Zimbabwe A' international footballers
Zimbabwean expatriate sportspeople in South Africa
Zimbabwean expatriate footballers
2011 African Nations Championship players